Ate, also known as Ate-Vitarte, is a district of the Lima Province in Peru. Located in the eastern part of the province, it is one of the districts that comprise the city of Lima.

History 
The Ate name is of Aymaran origin and denoted a local Native town, while the Vitarte name is a Castilian Spanish derivation of the Basque family name Ubitarte, which were the original Spanish landowners in the surrounding area.

The district of Ate was founded by express law on August 4, 1821 by General Don José de San Martín, a few days after Peru's declaration of independence. This law created the province of Lima and the districts into which it would be divided: Ancón, Ate, Carabayllo, Chorrillos, Lurigancho and Lima.

It gained importance during the government of Marshal Ramón Castilla, who granted his lands, between 1855 and 1862, to the citizen Don Carlos López Aldana to protect the development of national industry.

Carlos López Aldana founded the Vitarte Textile Factory in 1872 (later CUVISA), which led to the construction of houses for the workers and their families, who, upon settling down, formed the town of Vitarte. Meanwhile, new industries were being installed in the area, making it the main industrial center of Lima for the following decades.

On February 13, 1951 with Law No. 11951, the district capital passed from the town of Ate to the town of Vitarte, which gave rise to the district being called "Ate Vitarte". Likewise, in the twentieth century a continuous dismemberment of what was the original territory of Ate began for the creation of other districts such as Chaclacayo in 1926, La Victoria (1920), Santiago de Surco (1944) with which it loses its exit Sea, and in the 70s, Surco loses the sea border with the foundation of San Juan de Miraflores and Villa el Salvador; El Agustino (1960). San Luis (1960), La Molina (1962) and Santa Anita (1989).

Since the 1980s, Vitarte has become one of the main receivers of provincial migration that, by now, had already taken over the traditional center of Lima. This resulted in the urbanization of Ate and its integration into the Urban Agglomerate, causing the loss of the agricultural territory that it originally had, as it was a riverside district to the Rímac River. Currently it is configured as a peripheral district, with residential and commercial areas already consolidated in Mayorazgo and Salamanca de Monterrico.

Geography 
The district has a total land area of 77.72 km². Its administrative center is located 355 meters above sea level.

Boundaries
 North: Lurigancho
 East: Santa Anita, Chaclacayo, Cieneguilla
 South: Santiago de Surco, La Molina, Pachacamac
 West: San Borja, San Luis

Demographics
According to the 2007 census by the INEI, the district has 478,278 inhabitants and a population density of 6,154 persons/km². In 2005, there were 105,190 households in the district. It is the 13th most populated district in Lima.

Points of interest
 Stadium "Estadio Monumental de Universitario de Deportes", home of one of the most popular football teams in Perú.
 Puruchuco Archeological Site
 Huaycan Archeological Site
 Cahuide Park

See also 
 Administrative divisions of Peru

References

External links

  Official web site of the Ate district
 Estadísticas de Ate
 Ate News

Ate